$ is the dollar or peso currency sign (36 in ASCII), primarily used to represent currencies.

$ may also refer to:

Currency
The sign is used for:
Dollar, used in many countries
Peso, used in many countries
Brazilian real
Nicaraguan córdoba
Canadian dollar
Tongan paanga
Cape Verdean escudo
Portuguese escudo (defunct), the currency of Portugal prior to the introduction of the Euro
Surinamese dollar
United States dollar, used by the United States and several other countries
The cifrão, a similar symbol,

Mathematics and computers
$, a sigil in computer programming
$, the standard alias for invoking JQuery (a JavaScript library)

Music
$ (Mark Sultan album)
Dollars (soundtrack), to the 1971 movie

Television and film
$ (film), 1971 film also known as Dollars

See also
Dollar (disambiguation)
Ֆ